Polycotylidae is a family of plesiosaurs from the Cretaceous, a sister group to Leptocleididae. Polycotylids first appeared during the Albian stage of the Early Cretaceous, before becoming abundant and widespread during the early Late Cretaceous. Several species survived into the final stage of the Cretaceous, the Maastrichtian.

With their short necks and large elongated heads, they resemble the pliosaurs, but closer phylogenetic studies indicate that they share many common features with the Leptocleididae and Elasmosauridae. They have been found worldwide, with specimens reported from New Zealand, Australia, Japan, Morocco, the US, Canada, Eastern Europe, and South America.

Phylogeny 

Cladogram after Albright, Gillette and Titus (2007).

Cladogram after Ketchum and Benson (2010).

Below is a cladogram of polycotylid relationships from Ketchum & Benson, 2011.

References

External links 
Palæos: The Vertebrates, Lepidosauromorpha: Cryptocleidoidea: Tricleidia

Cretaceous plesiosaurs
Aptian first appearances
Maastrichtian extinctions
 
Prehistoric reptile families